Neil William Thimbleby (born 19 June 1939) is a former New Zealand rugby union player. A prop, Thimbleby represented Hawke's Bay at a provincial level, and was a member of the New Zealand national side, the All Blacks, on their 1970 tour to South Africa. He played 13 matches for the All Blacks on that tour, including one international.

References

1939 births
Living people
Rugby union players from Lower Hutt
New Zealand rugby union players
New Zealand international rugby union players
Hawke's Bay rugby union players
Rugby union props
People educated at Rangitikei College